Rewa is a province of Fiji. With a land area of 272 square kilometers (the smallest of Fiji's provinces), it includes the capital city of Suva (but not most of Suva's suburbs) and is in two parts — one including part of Suva's hinterland to the west and a noncontiguous area to the east, separated from the rest of Rewa by Naitasiri Province. The province had a population of 108,016 at the 2017 census, making it Fiji's third most populous.

For political and traditional reasons, Rewa is a powerful province. It is the hinterland of the national capital and the heart of the Burebasaga Confederacy, one of three traditional chiefly hierarchies. The Roko Tui Dreketi, or Paramount Chief of Rewa, is the head Burebasaga. The last two holders of the title have been women: Ro Lady Lala Mara (1931-2004), the wife of Fiji's longtime prime minister and President Ratu Sir Kamisese Mara, and her sister and successor, Ro Teimumu Kepa, who was Minister of Education in the government of Prime Minister Qarase  (2001-2006). In 2014, she led the Social Democratic Liberal Party (SoDelPa) in the parliamentary election, the first since the military coup of 2006, and served as Leader of the Opposition from 2014 to 2018. Rewa has 2 traditional chiefs. The other being the Turaga na Vunivalu. Both of which carry out their respective duties for the betterment of the province of Rewa. The current holder of the Vunivalu Title is Ro Epeli Vakacaracara Mataitini.

Rewa is governed by a Provincial Council. For a period in the early 2000s, the chairmanship was vacant, and the Council decided not to fill it until the Constitution could be changed to allow parliamentarians to hold national and provincial office simultaneously, thereby allowing their Paramount Chief, Ro Teimumu Kepa, to take the position. In the interim, Pita Tagicakiverata served as acting chairman.

The province comprises nine tikina (or districts):

Rewa
Noco
Dreketi
Burebasaga
Toga
Vutia
Suva
Raviravi
Sawau

References

 
Rewa
Rewa